Ben M'Hidi is a district and a town with 23,000 inhabitants on the Mediterranean Sea, in El Taref Province, west of Annaba, Algeria.

Municipalities
The district is further divided into 3 municipalities:

Ben Mehdi
Echatt
Berrihane

Districts of El Taref Province